Bruce Sweeney (born in Sarnia, Ontario) is a Canadian film director. He has spent his career based primarily in Vancouver, British Columbia.

Career
Sweeney's debut film, Live Bait, won the award for Best Canadian Feature Film at the 1995 Toronto International Film Festival.

He won the 2002 Canadian Comedy Award for Pretty Funny Film Direction for the film Last Wedding. The film also won the award for Best Canadian Film from the Toronto Film Critics Association.

On June 5, 2010, Sweeney's film Excited won four Leo Awards for Best Feature Length Drama, Best Direction in a Feature Length Drama, Best Supporting Performance by a Female in a Feature Length Drama (Gabrielle Rose) and Best Lead Performance by a Female in a Feature Length Drama (Laara Sadiq). In October 2013 The Dick Knost Show won Best BC Film at the Vancouver International Film Festival.

Filmography
Live Bait (1995)
Dirty (1998)
Last Wedding (2001)
American Venus (2007)
Excited (2009)
The Crimes of Mike Recket (2012)
The Dick Knost Show (2013)
Kingsway (2018)

References

External links

Film directors from Ontario
Canadian male screenwriters
Living people
Writers from Ontario
People from Sarnia
1960s births
Canadian Comedy Award winners
20th-century Canadian screenwriters
20th-century Canadian male writers
21st-century Canadian screenwriters
21st-century Canadian male writers